Natalie K. Wight (born 1974/1975) is an American lawyer who is the United States attorney for the District of Oregon.

Education

Wight is a 1992 graduate of Cleveland High School of Portland, Oregon. She received a Bachelor of Science from the College of Idaho in 1996, a Master of Science from California State University in 2000 and a Juris Doctor from the University of Notre Dame Law School in 2003.

Career 

Wight was an attorney at the Federal Bureau of Prisons from 2003 to 2008. From 2008 to 2012, she served as an assistant United States attorney in the United States Attorney's Office for the Northern District of California. From 2012 to 2022, she served as an assistant United States attorney in the United States Attorney's Office for the District of Oregon.

U.S. attorney for the District of Oregon 

On June 6, 2022, President Joe Biden nominated Wight to be the United States attorney for the District of Oregon. Her nomination was supported by Senators Ron Wyden and Jeff Merkley. On September 8, 2022, she was confirmed in the Senate by voice vote. She assumed office on September 12, 2022.

References

1970s births
Living people
Year of birth missing (living people)
Place of birth missing (living people)
21st-century American women lawyers
21st-century American lawyers
Assistant United States Attorneys
California State University alumni
College of Idaho alumni
Notre Dame Law School alumni
Oregon lawyers
United States Attorneys for the District of Oregon